Wapello may refer to:

People
Wapello (chief) (1787-1842), a Native American chief

Places
United States
Wapello, Idaho
Wapello, Iowa
Wapello County, Iowa

Ships
USS Wapello (YN-56), a United States Navy net tender in commission from 1941 to 1946